Jens Kunath (born 15 February 1967) is a German former footballer.

References

External links

1967 births
Living people
People from Lauchhammer
People from Bezirk Cottbus
German footballers
East German footballers
Footballers from Brandenburg
FC Hansa Rostock players
Chongqing Liangjiang Athletic F.C. players
Expatriate footballers in China
German expatriates in China
Eisenhüttenstädter FC Stahl players
Bundesliga players
2. Bundesliga players
Association football goalkeepers